Hal (stylized HΛL, replacing the Latin "A" with the Greek "Λ" or Lambda) is a Japanese pop band formed in 1996. They have worked with several Japanese pop and rock stars and also have won two Japan Record Awards for their musical arrangements for singer Ayumi Hamasaki (with "Free & Easy" in 2002 and "No way to say" in 2003).

Biography
Hal went from music arrangers into a music band and then back to music arrangers, arranging songs for many Japanese artists. Toshiharu Umezaki (sometimes written as Toshiyasu Umezaki) is known as the main member and leader of the band, which had gone through some deformations in their structure.

The sound of Hal is mainly a lively digital beat at the edge where the electric guitars are used a lot, as a special feature and typic in their arrangements.

Hal started out as music arrangers in 1999 and became known especially for the work that they did (and are still doing) with Ayumi Hamasaki. "Appears", "Fly High", "M", "Evolution" and "No Way to Say" are some of their most famous tunes with her. They also have worked with some other artists like Ami Suzuki, the KinKi Kids, Every Little Thing and Dream.

In 2000 the group of men did a casting to choose a female vocalist for forming the musical group Hal, which was an idea of Toshiharu Umesaki and Atsushi Sato's. Finally the singer Halna was chosen to be a part of Hal and they signed a deal with record label Avex Trax. They temporarily stopped their group as arrangers after the work with "Grip!" from Every Little Thing.

After the release of seven singles and two studio albums as Hal, the band got separated in 2003 because Halna decided to leave the group and get away from the spotlight, with the release of their final album, called "Singles", a compilation album with all the singles released by the band, and they started to work again as arrangers with Ayumi Hamasaki and Tackey & Tsubasa. Atsushi Sato also left the band that year to arrange music on his own, under the nickname of ats-. He has recently worked with Ami Suzuki under Avex and Yuta Nakano, who left the band in early 2001 is currently working as remixer and also arranger.

Currently Umezaki and Shimizu keep their name Hal active, arranging songs for Japanese singers and music groups.

Discography 
HAL's single "The Starry Sky" was the ending theme for the anime Angelic Layer. The Angelic Layer OST also featured another song by HAL, "Justice" including a few remixes of both. HAL's 6th single, "I'll be the One", is the second opening of Hikaru No Go.

Singles 
Decide, October 25, 2000
Save Me, January 11, 2001
Split Up, March 28, 2001
The Starry Sky May 23, 2001
Al Di La, April 17, 2002
I'll Be the One, July 19, 2002
One Love / A Long Journey, August 16, 2002

Albums 
 Violation of the Rules, August 29, 2001
 As Long As You Love Me, August 28, 2002
Singles, February 26, 2003

DVD 
Greatest Hal Clips: Chapter One, April 17, 2002
One, August 28, 2002

External links 
Hal (Music Group) Official Website at Avex Trax

蜃気楼２ – Hal's Fan Site A comprehensive list of songs composed and arranged by Hal

Avex Group artists
Japanese dance music groups
Japanese pop music groups